Li Yang (born 7 May 1999) is a Chinese footballer currently playing as a midfielder for Meizhou Hakka.

Career statistics

Club
.

References

1999 births
Living people
Chinese footballers
Association football midfielders
China League One players
Dalian Professional F.C. players
Meizhou Hakka F.C. players